The Danish Chamber of Commerce (Danish: Dansk Erhverv) is the network for the service industry in Denmark and one of the largest professional business organisations in the country. It is headquartered in Børsen in Copenhagen and has additional offices in Aarhus and Bruxelles.

History 
The Danish Chamber of Commerce was founded on 1 January 2007 as a result of a merger between Dansk Handel & Service and the Chamber of Commerce (previously Handelskammeret, HTSI).

Traditionally the organisation’s portfolio has been within the service sector, e.g. retail and wholesale, the transport sector, consultant companies, tourism and hospitality sector etc.

The first CEO was Lars Krobæk. He was on 1 April 2008 replaced by Jens Klarskov, who was in turn on 22 June 2018 replaced by former Minister and former member of The Danish Parliament, Brian Mikkelsen.

Goal 
As an employers’ organisation, The Danish Chamber of Commerce negotiates a broad range of collective agreements on various areas and within many industries. The Danish Chamber of Commerce is a member of The Confederation of Danish Employers (DA).

As an employers’ organisation the Danish Chamber of Commerce is working towards securing optimal competitive conditions for Danish business. This entails protection of interests in The Danish Parliament (Folketinget), in the European Union, and in the local constituencies and in the regions.

The Danish Chamber of Commerce owns and resides in King Christian IV's Old Stock Exchange building on Slotsholmen in Copenhagen. Furthermore the organisation has offices in the neighbouring complex, Tietgens Hus, as well as an office in Aarhus and an EU-office in Bruxelles.

References

External links
Official website

Business organizations based in Denmark
Employers' organizations in Denmark
Organizations based in Copenhagen
Organizations established in 2007
2007 establishments in Denmark